The Teichobiinae are a subfamily of moth of the family Tineidae.

Genera
 Dinochora
 Ectropoceros
 Psychoides

References

External links